Moscopole or Voskopoja (with several other variants) is a village in Korçë County in southeastern Albania. During the 18th century, it was the cultural and commercial center of the Aromanians. At its peak, in the mid 18th century, it hosted the first printing house in the Ottoman Balkans outside Constantinople, educational institutions and numerous churches. It became a leading center of Greek culture, but also of symbiotic Albanian–Aromanian culture and with great influence from Western civilization.

One view attributes the decline of the city to a series of raids by Muslim Albanian bandits. Moscopole was initially attacked and almost destroyed by those groups in 1769 following the participation of the residents in the preparations for a Greek revolt supported by the Russian Empire. Its destruction culminated with the abandoning and destruction of 1788. Moscopole, once a prosperous city, was reduced to a small village by Ali Pasha of Ioannina. According to another view, the city's decline was mainly due to the relocation of the trade routes in central and eastern Europe following these raids. Today Moscopole, known as Voskopojë, is a small mountain village, and along with a few other local settlements is considered a holy place by local Orthodox Christians. It was one of the original homelands of much of the Aromanian diaspora. It has been also nicknamed as "Jerusalem of the Aromanians", "New Athens" or "Arcadia of the Balkans".

In modern times, Aromanians no longer form a majority of the population, with incoming Christian and Muslim Albanians having further settled in the village, especially after World War II.

Name
The  variant is also used in various occasions in Greek.

Geography
Modern Moscopole is located 21 km from Korçë, in the mountains of southeastern Albania, at an altitude of 1160 meters, and is a subdivision of Korçë municipality; its population in 2011 was 1,058. The municipality of Moscopole consists of the villages of Moscopole, Shipskë, Krushovë, Gjonomadh and Lavdar. In 2005, the municipality had a population of 2,218, whereas the settlement itself has a population of around 500.

History

Prosperity

Demographics

Although located in a rather isolated place in the mountains of southern Albania, the city rose to become the most important center of the Aromanians. Many of its inhabitants originated from the southern parts of Epirus, such as the settlements of Skamneli and Metsovo (an Aromanian settlement as well) in northwestern Greece. It was a small settlement until the end of the 17th century, but afterwards showed a remarkable financial and cultural development. Some writers have claimed that Moscopole in its glory days (1730–1760) had as many as 70,000 inhabitants; other estimates placed its population closer to 35,000; but a more realistic number may be closer to 3,500. According to Max Demeter Peyfuss, "the truth may be closer to this number [sc. 3500] than to 70,000. Moschopolis was certainly not among the largest Balkan cities of the 18th century".

According to the Swedish historian Johann Thunmann, who visited Moscopole and wrote a history of the Aromanians in 1774, everyone in the city spoke Aromanian; many also spoke Greek, which was used for writing contracts. In fact the city is said to have been mainly populated by Aromanians. The fact was confirmed by a 1935 analysis of family names that showed that in the 18th century the majority of the population were indeed Aromanians, but there were also Greeks, Albanians and Bulgarians present in the city.

Economy

Historically, the main economic activity of the city was livestock farming. The alternative name "Voskopolis" and derived ones mean "city of shepherds". This activity led to the establishment of wool processing and carpet manufacturing units and the development of tanneries, while other locals became metal workers and silver and copper smiths. During the middle of the 18th century, the city became an important economic center whose influence spread over the boundaries of the Archbishopric of Ohrid, and reached further the Ottoman-ruled Eastern Orthodox world. This trade involved as far as the Archduchy of Austria, the Kingdom of Hungary, and the Upper Saxony. Until 1769, the town traded on a large scale with renowned European commercial centres of that time, such as Venice, Vienna and Leipzig.

Culture
A printing press operated in Moscopole, which produced religious literature and school textbooks in Greek. It was the second printing press in Ottoman Europe to be established after that of Constantinople under the supervision of Gregory, future bishop of Durrës. This establishment produced a total of nineteen books, mainly the collection of the Services to the Saints but also the Introduction of Grammar by the local scholar Theodore Kavalliotis. All locally printed books were exclusively written in Greek with the indication En Moschopolei. Claims by some Balkan scholars about the possible existence of multilingual prints or prints in Albanian, Aromanian or Slavic have not been verified. Kavalliotis later became director of the city's prestigious educational institution, which from 1744 was known as New Academy or Hellenikon Frontistirion, sponsored by wealthy foreign merchants. This institution became one of the leading centers of learning for Orthodox Christians in western Balkans. The language of education was Greek while renowned Greek teachers were invited to provide lessons. 

The city also hosted an orphanage, known as Orphanodioiketerion, possibly the first in the post-Byzantine Orthodox world; and also a hospital and a total of 24 churches.

A cultural effervescence arose in Moscopole, and many authors published their works in both the Greek language (which was the language of culture of the Balkans at the time) and Aromanian, written in the Greek alphabet. In 1770, the first dictionary of four modern Balkan languages (Greek, Albanian, Aromanian and Bulgarian) was published here. Daniel Moscopolites, an Aromanian native priest of Moscopole, compiled a quadrilingual lexicon of Greek, Aromanian, Bulgarian and Albanian, that aimed at the Hellenization of the non-Greek-speaking Christian communities in the Balkans. Due to the high level of intellectual activity and Greek education, Moscopole was nicknamed as New Athens or New Mystra. As such, the city became an important 18th century center of the modern Greek Enlightenment.

The Aromanian Missal, an 18th-century liturgical book in Aromanian, was likely written in Moscopole.

Decline

The 1769 sacking and pillaging by Muslim Albanian troops was just the first of a series of attacks to the city. Moscopole was attacked due to the participation of the residents in the preparations for a Greek revolt supported by the Russian Empire known as the Orlov Revolt. Its destruction culminated with the razing of 1788 by the troops of Ali Pasha of Ioannina. Moscopole was practically destroyed by this attack, with some of its commerce shifting to nearby Korçë and Berat.

The survivors were thus forced to flee, most of them emigrating mainly to Thessaly and Macedonia. Orthodox Albanians from Moscopole which migrated in the beginning of the 19th century to Kruševo would found the so called Ohtul di Arbinesh (Hill of the Albanians) neighbourhood. This community would soon assimilate into the Aromanian population of the city. Some of the commercial elite moved to the Archduchy of Austria, and the Kingdom of Hungary, especially to the respective capitals of Vienna and Budapest, but also to Transylvania, where they had an important role in the early national awakening of Romania. The city never rose back to its earlier status. However, a new school was established at the end of the 18th century whose headmaster in 1802 was Daniel Moscopolites. This school functioned the following decades, thanks to donations and bequests by baron Simon Sinas. The diaspora of Moscopole located in Austria and Hungary continued the tradition of their ancestors by sponsoring institutions beneficial to the Greek people. During this period, many members of the Aromanian diaspora who migrated to Budapest and Vienna started developing a unique Aromanian identity, being one of the first Aromanian populations to do so. These cities became gathering centers for Aromanians and Aromanian language and culture was promoted.

In 1900, a report by the Greek consul Betsos gave details of the demographic composition of Moscopole. It noted that the 18th century destruction of the settlement resulted in the dispersal of its Aromanian population and that some old remaining families moved to other places, in particular Korçë. Around 30 old families remained, with the socio-political crisis that engulfed the nearby Opar region resulting in Albanian Christians leaving their previous homes and settling in Moscopole. Aromanians from two nearby settlements also resettled in Moscopole. In 1900, Moscopole was populated by a total of 200 families, consisting of 120 Albanian and 80 Aromanian families. Most of the older Aromanian families had a Greek national consciousness while 3 families along with some of the newer residents were pro-Romanian (from a total of 20 older families), led by an unfrocked priest named Kosmas.

In 1914, Moscopole was part of the Autonomous Republic of Northern Epirus. The now village was destroyed again in 1916 during World War I by the marauding Albanian bands of Salih Butka, who set Moscopole on fire and killed a number of local civilians. Butka is considered among Aromanian circles as a criminal due to this event. This incident was followed by the looting of the village's churches by French soldiers belonging to the administration of the Autonomous Province of Korçë.

During the Greco-Italian War, on 30 November 1940, the town was captured by the advancing Greek forces. In April 1941, after the capitulation of Greece, Moscopole returned to Axis control. The remaining buildings were razed three times during the partisan warfare of World War II: once by Italian troops and twice by the Albanian nationalist Balli Kombëtar organization. Of the old city, six Orthodox churches (one in a very ruined state), a bridge and a monastery survive. In 1996, the church of St. Michael was vandalized by three adolescent Albanians under the influence of a foreign Muslim fundamentalist. In 2002, the five standing churches were put on the World Monuments Fund's 2002 World Monuments Watch.

Modern times
At 1996 the church of Saint Michael was vandalized by Albanian adolescents, an incident that shocked and dismayed the Albanian public. Today, Moscopole is just a small mountain village and ski resort. Nonetheless, memories of glory days of Moscopole remain an important part of the culture of the Aromanians. During recent years, a Greek language institution and a joint Greek–Albanian initiative has operated in Moscopole. Moscopole, known in Albania as being a traditionally Christian settlement, is a neighbour to various Muslim and Christian Albanian villages that surround it, although the latter ones have become "demographically depressed" due to migration. During the communist period, some Muslims from surrounding villages settled in Moscopole, making locals view the village population as mixed (i përzier) and lamenting the decline of the Christian element.

In modern times, Aromanians no longer form a majority of the population, with incoming Christian and Muslim Albanians having further settled in the village, especially after the Second World War. According to the 2011 Albanian census, out of the 1,058 inhabitants, 69.57% declared themselves as Albanian, 5.48% declared themselves as Aromanian, 0.47% declared themselves as Macedonians, and 0.09% as Greek. The rest of the population did not specify its ethnicity. In term of religion, the same census claimed Moscopole as a Muslim-majority village by 76.07% with an Eastern Orthodox minority of 11.69%. However, on the quality of the specific data the Advisory Committee on the Framework Convention for the Protection of National Minorities stated that "the results of the census should be viewed with the utmost caution and calls on the authorities not to rely exclusively on the data on nationality collected during the census in determining its policy on the protection of national minorities." Furthermore, the census was boycotted by a significant number of the Greek community of Albania, typically of Eastern Orthodox denomination.

Orthodox churches and monasteries

The remaining churches in the region are among the most representative of 18th century ecclesiastical art in the Balkans. Characteristically, their murals are comparable to that in the large monastic centres at Mount Athos and Meteora, both in Greece. The architectural design is in general specific and identical: a large three-aisled basilica with a gable roof. The churches are single-apsed, with a wide altar apse and internal niches that serve as prothesis and diaconicon. Most churches also have one niche, each on the northern and southern walls, next to the prothesis and the diaconicon. Along the southern side there is an arched porch.

Of the original around 24–30 churches of Moscopole, besides the St. John the Baptist Monastery in the vicinity of the town, only five have survived into modern times: 
Saint Nicholas
Dormition of the Theotokos
Saint Athanasius
Saint Michael or Archangels Michael and Gabriel
Saint Elijah

Some of the ruined churches include the following:
Saint Paraskevi, patron saint of the town and probably the first church built in Moscopole in the 15th century
Saint Charalampus, outer walls partially survived
Saint Euthymius, completely destroyed.

Climate
There is a combination of mild valley climate in the lower parts and true Alpine climate in the higher regions. Favorable climate conditions make this center ideal for winter, summer, sport and recreation tourism, so there are tourists during the whole year, and not only from areas of Albania, but also foreigners.

Notable people
People born in Moscopole:

 Ioannis Chalkeus (1667–between 1730 and 1740), scholar and philosopher 
 Theophrastos Georgiadis (1885–1973), author and teacher
 Nicolae Ianovici, linguist
 Theodore Kavalliotis (1718–1789), priest and teacher
 Georgios Konstantinidis, hieromonk and founder of the Moscopole printing house
 Dionysios Mantoukas (1648–1751), Orthodox bishop
 Violeta Manushi (1926–2007), actress
 Ioakeim Martianos (1875–1955), Orthodox bishop
 Daniel Moscopolites (1754–1825), scholar 
 Nektarios Terpos (late 17th century–18th century), religious scholar and monk
 Konstantinos Tzechanis (1740–1800), philosopher, mathematician and poet
 Constantin Ucuta, academic and protopope in Prussia
  (1867–1936), politician, professor and writer

Others with roots in Moscopole:
 Mihail G. Boiagi (1780–1828, 1842 or 1843), grammarian and professor
 Llazar Fundo (1899–1944), communist politician, journalist and writer
 Emanoil Gojdu (1802–1870), lawyer
 Mocioni family, with notable members of this family including Andrei Mocioni (1812–1880)
 Max Demeter Peyfuss (1944–2019), historian, translator and writer
 Sinas family, with notable members of this family including Georgios Sinas (1783–1856) and Simon Sinas (1810–1876)
 Konstantinos Smolenskis (1843–1915), Hellenic Army officer

Gallery

See also
 Aromanians in Albania
 Tourism in Albania

References

Bibliography
 Asterios Koukoudis Studies on the Vlachs (in Greek and English)
 Românii din Albania – Aromânii(in Romanian)
 
 Steliu Lambru, Narrating National Utopia – The Case Moschopolis in the Aromanian National Discourse (in English)
 
 Nicolas Trifon, Des Aroumains aux Tsintsares - Destinées Historiques Et Littéraires D’un Peuple Méconnu (in French)
 Ewa Kocój, The Story of an Invisible City. The Cultural Heritage of Moscopole in Albania. Urban Regeneration, Cultural Memory and Space Management [in:] Intangible heritage of the city. Musealisation, preservation, education, ed. By M. Kwiecińska, Kraków 2016, s. 267-280

Further reading
 
 
 
 
 Robert Elsie, Eifel Olzheim. Review:  Peyfuß, Max Demeter: Die Druckerei von Moschopolis, 1731–1769. Buchdruck und Heiligenverehrung im Erzbistum Achrida.

 
Destroyed cities
Epirus
Aromanians in Albania
Aromanian settlements in Albania
Administrative units of Korçë
Villages in Korçë County